Charles Clover may refer to:

 Charles Clover-Brown (1907-1982), English cricketer
 Charles Clover, journalist at The Financial Times, covering China and formerly Russia
 Charles Clover, environmental journalist, author and documentary maker
 Charles Clover (born 1955), British javelin thrower

References